Atlético Nacional Femenino is a professional women's football club based in Medellín, Colombia. They are the women's football section of Atlético Nacional and they currently play in the Colombian Women's Football League, the top level women's football league in Colombia.

History
Atlético Nacional Femenino was founded on 1 January 2009.

Honours

Domestic
Liga Femenina Profesional:
Runners-up (1): 2018

References

Atlético Nacional
Women's football clubs in Colombia
Association football clubs established in 2009
2009 establishments in Colombia